Pentecost III is an EP by the British doom metal band Anathema. It was recorded in 1994 but, due to a merging between labels Peaceville Records and Music for Nations, was not released until 1995. By this time, Darren White had been ousted from the band, whose remaining members were already working on their next album, The Silent Enigma.  Pentecost III was re-issued as on one CD with The Crestfallen in 2001.

Track listing
All lyrics written by White, all music written by Anathema.

Notes
The album's liner notes state that "Pentecost III is dedicated to Tony Doyle, to Lin Mari Lowles, and to all the people who shared the grief of the terrible tragedy that befell us all this year 1994".  Tony and Lin were two old friends of Anathema. Tony died from heart complications in his early twenties and, on the way to the funeral, Lin died in a traffic accident.
 The track "Memento Mori" contains the hidden track "Horses/666". On the Pentecost III/Crestfallen EP re-issue this hidden track is moved to the end of "They Die", the last track on the disc.
 Album artwork: painting by Frederic Leighton "Perseus and Andromeda", 1891.
 Orchestral versions of "Kingdom" and "We, the Gods" were recorded for the 2011 compilation Falling Deeper.

Credits
 Daniel Cavanagh — guitar
 Vincent Cavanagh — guitar
 John Douglas — drums
 Duncan Patterson — bass guitar
 Darren White — vocals

References

Anathema (band) albums
1993 EPs